Sam Mirza (161112 May 1642), better known by his dynastic name of Shah Safi, was the sixth Safavid shah (king) of Iran, ruling from 1629 to 1642.

Early life 
Safi was given the name Sam Mirza when he was born. He was the son of Mohammad Baqer Mirza, the eldest son of Shah Abbas I, and Dilaram Khanum, a Georgian wife. In 1615, Abbas had Mohammed Baqer killed, fearing he was plotting against his life. Over the next few years, the suspicious Abbas killed or blinded his other sons, leaving his grandson Safi heir to the throne.

Reign 

Safi was crowned on 28 January 1629 at the age of eighteen. He ruthlessly eliminated anyone he regarded as a threat to his power, executing almost all the Safavid royal princes as well as leading courtiers and generals. He paid little attention to the business of government and had no cultural or intellectual interests (he had never learned to read or write properly), preferring to spend his time drinking wine or indulging in his addiction to opium. Supposedly, however, he abhorred tobacco smoke as much as his grandfather did, going as far as to have those caught smoking tobacco in public killed by pouring molten lead in their mouths.

The dominant political figure of Safi's reign was Saru Taqi, appointed grand vizier in 1634. Saru Taqi was incorruptible and highly efficient at raising revenues for the state, but he could also be autocratic and arrogant.

Iran's foreign enemies took the opportunity to exploit Safi's perceived weakness. Despite firm initial Safavid successes and humiliating defeats in the Ottoman–Safavid War (1623–1639) by Safi's grandfather and predecessor Shah Abbas the Great, the Ottomans, having had their economy and military stabilized and reorganized under Sultan Murad IV made incursions in the west in one year following Safi's ascension to the throne. In 1634 they briefly occupied Yerevan and Tabriz and in 1638 they finally succeeded in recapturing Baghdad Reconquest of Baghdad (1638) and other parts of Mesopotamia (Iraq) which, despite being taken again several times later on in history by the Persians and most notably by Nader Shah, it would all remain in their hands until the aftermath of World War I. Nevertheless, the Treaty of Zuhab which ensued in 1639 put an end to all further wars between the Safavids and the Ottomans. Apart from the Ottoman wars, Iran was troubled by the Uzbeks and Turkmens in the east and briefly lost Kandahar in their easternmost territories to the Mughals in 1638, due to what seems as an act of revenge by their own governor over the region, Ali Mardan Khan, after being dismissed from office.

In 1636 he received a trade delegation from Frederick III, Duke of Holstein-Gottorp, which included Adam Olearius. Olearius wrote a book about this visit in 1647, which was widely published in Europe. In 1639, Safi sent a return delegation to Holstein-Gottorp, bestowing gifts on the Duke. However, the Duke did not succeed in his ultimate aim - starting a regular trading relationship with Iran (and Russia) and making the Duke's newly founded town of Friedrichstadt into a European trade terminus.

Safi died on 12 May 1642 and was buried in Qom. He was succeeded by his son Abbas II. His death was related to heavy drinking. According to one account, found in Archangelo Lamberti's Relation de la Colchide ou Mengrellie (1654), Safi died in a drinking contest with a certain Scedan Cilaze (Chiladze), a renowned Georgian drinking champion invited to Isfahan from Mingrelia.

Family
Consorts
Safi had three wives:
 Anna Khanum (died 9 September 1647), a Circassian, and daughter of Urgurlu Beg, his former slave;
 Princess Tinatin (m. 1634), daughter of Teimuraz I of Kakheti, by his second wife, Queen Khoreshan-Darejan, daughter of Giorgi X, King of Kartli;
 A daughter of Bika (m. 1637), a Circassian, and sister of Prince Mussal;  

Sons
Safi had five sons:
 Sultan Mohammad Mirza, succeeded regnally as Abbas II;
 Tahmasp Mirza (blinded 1642);
 Bahram Mirza (blinded 1642);
 Sultan Haidar Mirza (blinded 1642);
 Ismail Haidar Mirza (blinded 1642);

Daughters
Safi had two daughters:
  Maryam Begum, married sadr, a grandson of Khalifeh Soltan;
 Pari Rukhsar Khanum, married brother of her sister's husband, the sadr;

References

Sources

Further reading
 

Safavid monarchs
Iranian people of Georgian descent
Iranian people of Circassian descent
1611 births
1642 deaths
17th-century monarchs of Persia
Burials in Iran
Burials at Fatima Masumeh Shrine
17th-century Iranian people